BAP is a German rock band. With eleven albums reaching the number one in the German record charts, BAP is one of the most successful rock acts in their home country.

Nearly all of BAP's lyrics are written in Kölsch, the dialect of Cologne, or more precisely in a Kölsch-influenced derivation of Eifelplatt, a regional variant of the Ripuarian language spoken in the nearby rural Eifel. Niedecken's most prominent musical influences, especially early in his career, were Bob Dylan, the Kinks, Bruce Springsteen, the Rolling Stones and Wolfgang Ambros.

History 

The group was founded in 1976 under the name Wolfgang Niedecken's BAP in Cologne by Wolfgang Niedecken and Hans Heres. In 1981, they released their most famous song "Verdamp lang her" (Damn long time ago), in which Niedecken describes regrets he has about his relationship with his then recently deceased father. The band's name "BAP" derived from "BAPP", both, a play-on-words on the Kölsch word "Papp" (related to the German word dad), but pronounced differently, and Niedecken's then-nickname.

Niedecken translated a collection of Bob Dylan's lyrics to German for his 1995 solo album Leopardefell.

Band members

Current members 
(Information valid for 2018)

 Wolfgang Niedecken – singer (1976–present)
 Werner Kopal – bass (1996–present)
 Michael Nass – keyboards (1999–present)
 Ulrich Rode – guitar (2014–present)
  – percussion (2014–present)
 Sönke Reich – drums (2014–present)
  – violin (2014–present)

Former members 
 "Afro" Bauermann – percussion (1976–1977)
 Rainer Gulich – saxophone (1976–1977)
 Hans Heres – guitar (1976–1980)
 Klaus Hogrefe – bass (1976–1978)
 Wolfgang Boecker – drums (1976–1983)
 Manfred Boecker – percussion (1976–1995)
 Wolfgang Klever – bass (1978–1980)
 Bernd Odenthal – keyboards (1978–1980)
 Fritz Kullmann – saxophone (1980)
 "Steve Borg" (Stephan Kriegeskorte) – bass (1980–1995)
 Klaus Heuser – guitar (1980–1999)
 Hans Wollrath – sounds (1980–1999)
 Alexander Büchel – keyboards (1981–1999)
 Jan Dix – drums (1983–1985)
 Pete King – drums (1986)
  – drums (1987–2014)
  – percussion (1996–1997)
  – saxophone (1996–2002)
  – percussion (1999–2003)
  – guitar (1999–2014)

Albums 

 1979:  [Wolfgang Niedecken's BAP rocks different Colognian songs]
 1980:  [Defrosted]
 1981:  [For cutout]
 1982:  [From the inside to the outside]
 1983:  [Live – So long...]
 1984:  [Between pretzels and beer]
 1985:  [Crystal night] (UK Sampler)
 1986:  [Old slick men]
 1988: 
 1990:  [Putting something over on someone]
 1991:  (Live) [Rocking...]
 1993:  [Seven of Spades]
 1995:  [Frenzy – The hits of 1979–1995]
 1996:  [America]
 1999: 
 1999:  [Talking movie]
 2001:  [Every now and then]
 2002:  (Live) [Everywhere]
 2004:  [Songs]
 2005:  [Thrice ten years]
 2008:  (plugged + unplugged)
 2009:  (Live) [Live and in color]
 2011:  [No big deal; literally: Half as wild]
 2011:  (Live) [Full programme]
 2014:  [The tale of the unplugged plug]
 2016:  [Lifelong]
 2016:  [The most popular songs 1976–2016]
 2016:  [Lifelong at ]
 2018:  [Live and pronounced]
 2020:  [Everything flows]

Singles 

 1980: "" [Chauvinist rock] / "" [Frenzy]
 1981: "" [Joe] / "" [Woman, I'm glad]
 1981: "" [Damn long time ago] / "" [Laundromat café]
 1982: "" [Kristallnacht] / "" [Fashion surfer]
 1982: "" [You can charm]
 1983: "" [Take me with you] / "" [Alongside a guardrail]
 1984: "" [Three wishes free] / "" [Sign-off]
 1984: "" [Alexandra, not only you] / "" [By accident with a little bit of luck]
 1985: "" [Coloured ruins] / ""
 1986: "" [Alone at last] / "" [Almanya = Germany in Turkish]
 1986: "Time Is Cash, Time Is Money" / "" [Sob stuff, if you want (live)]
 1988: "" [To be continued] / ""
 1988: "" [Container season]
 1988: "" [This felt good] / "" [Taking it on the clown's credit]
 1989: "" / "" [To the right and left of the railway embankment]
 1990: "" [Everything's alright] / "" [Back then]
 1991: "" [Face to face] / "" [In close reach]
 1991: "" [She's addictive] / "Happy End"
 1991: "" [Damn long time ago] / "" [Best regards (Live)]
 1993: "" [Disgusting] / "" [Blond Mohikans]
 1993: "" [Like the moon's crescent]
 1993: "" [A few days earlier]
 1995: "" [I dance with you]
 1996: "" [Let them talk]
 1996: "" [Nothing as it was before]
 1996: "" [Christmas night] (This is a German-language version of Fairytale of New York by The Pogues)
 1998: ""
 1999: "" [In and of itself]
 1999: ""
 1999: "Mayday"
 2000: "" [FC, step on it! (Promotion version)]
 2001: "" [Every now and then]
 2001: "Shoeshine"
 2002: "" [End, over, okay]
 2003: "" [FC, step on it! (the third version)]
 2004: "" [Whenever you don't know what to do]
 2004: "" [For Maria]
 2005: "" [Woman, I'm glad]
 2006: "" [A damn long time ago (The damn long single)]
 2006: "Time Is Cash, Time Is Money (feat. Culcha Candela)"
 2008: "" [Home tomorrow morning]
 2011: "" [No big deal; literally: Half as wild]
 2012: "" [All the moments]

Related projects 
 1983: Book BAP övver BAP [BAP about BAP]
 1987: Album Schlagzeiten [Hit times] (Wolfgang Niedecken solo-album)
 1989: Book BAP övver China (about their Chinese tour)
 1992: Album Arsch huh, Zäng ussenander [Get up and speak out] (various bands from Cologne, live concert against racism and neo-fascism)
 1995: Album Leopardefell [Leopard's skin] Wolfgang Niedecken solo-album with translated Dylan lyrics)
 2002: Film Vill passiert [A lot has happened] (film by Wim Wenders about BAP)
 2011: Book Für 'ne Moment [For a moment] (autobiography by Wolfgang Niedecken & Oliver Kobold)

Literature 
 Niedecken, Wolfgang: Immer weiter/BAP-Logbücher 2000–2004. Verlag Kiepenheuer & Witsch, Köln 2004, .
 Kobold, Oliver (ed.): BAP Die Songs 1976–2006 (Textsammlung), Verlag Hoffmann und Campe, Hamburg 2006, .
 Kobold, Oliver (ed.): BAP Neue Songs 2007–2011 (Textsammlung), Verlag Hoffmann und Campe, Hamburg 2011, .
 Niedecken, Wolfgang, Kobold, Oliver: Für 'ne Moment. Autobiographie. Hoffmann & Campe, Hamburg 2011, .
 Niedecken, Wolfgang, Kobold, Oliver: Zugabe – Die Geschichte einer Rückkehr. Autobiographie. Hoffmann & Campe, Hamburg 2013, .

See also 
 Birlikte – Zusammenstehen (parts of the performance at the festival are published on

References

External links 

 
 "Rockpalast" concert, Markthalle, Hamburg, 28 November 1981 [2:27:41]
 Concert, Festhalle, Frankfurt am Main, 23 November 1984 [1:13:39]
 "Clubtour" concert, Batschkapp, Frankfurt am Main, 21 February 1991 [2:57:00]
 "ZDF@Bauhaus #61" unplugged concert, Bauhaus, Dessau, 15 October 2014 [1:02:22]

German rock music groups
Musical groups from Cologne
Musical groups established in 1976
1976 establishments in West Germany